The Burning Word is an album by Irish folk singer Johnny Duhan and was released in 2010.

The Burning Word is the first completely new album Johnny Duhan has produced in many years. The dove emerging from the lick of fire on the cover is symbolic not only of the fact that the songs are spiritual but also that the collection has evolved from one of Duhan's last studio albums, Flame, and may one day merge with it. Over the years Duhan has received letters from people all over the world telling him that the spiritual dimension in his songs has helped them through times of crisis as well as marking occasions of celebration. This contributed to his going below the surface of his faith for this work.

Track listing
 "The Coat"
 "The Flame is Lit"
 "This World is not Conclusion"
 "Wonders"
 "Surrender"
 "The Burning Word"
 "Song of the Bird"
 "The Storm"
 "Sure Amen"
 "Part of the Tribe"
 "Old Story"

References

External links
Johnny Duhan Homepage

2010 albums
Johnny Duhan albums